Capello is a surname of Italian origin that may refer to:

 Alessandro Capello (born 1995), Italian footballer
 Ambrosius Capello (1597–1676), bishop of Antwerp
 Angelo Cappello (born 2002), Belizean professional footballer 
 Bartolomeo Ignazio Capello (1689-1768), Italian painter
 Davide Capello (born 1984), Italian footballer
 Domenico Capello (1888–1950), Italian footballer
 Fabio Capello (born 1946), Italian footballer and football manager
 Giovanni Antonio Capello (1699–1741), Italian painter
 Luigi Capello (1859–1941), Italian army officer
 Rinaldo Capello (born 1964), Italian racing driver
 Sherry Capello, mayor of Lebanon, Pennsylvania
 Vittore Capello (1588–1648), Roman Catholic prelate

See also
 Cappello
 Cappello romano, a hat worn by Catholic clergy.
 Copello, a similar Spanish-language surname

Italian-language surnames